MysteryQuest is an American Paranormal television series that premiered on September 16, 2009 on History. Produced by KPI Productions, the program is a spin-off of MonsterQuest. The series tag line is "What if everything you believe is wrong?"

Overview
The purpose of the show is best described by the narrator in the introduction:

The series examines various persistent mysteries (dubbed "case files") around the world, following teams of investigators who travel abroad to collect and examine evidence and study both popularly accepted explanations and alternate viewpoints regarding a particular case file.

Reviews
"MysteryQuest delivers on its promise to attempt to unlock new answers to unsolved mysteries." ~ Season one DVD review, Zach Freeman, TV Rage

"...it sometimes seems like the writers go into a particular mystery with a preconceived idea of what happened and only look at evidence that supports that idea." ~ Common Sense Media

Notable case findings
The episode titled "Hitler's Escape" made news after the forensic exam performed by Nick Bellantoni and DNA testing by Linda Strausbaugh, Craig O'Connor, and Heather Nelson concluded that the skull that the Russian government possesses and purported to be Adolf Hitler's is actually from a woman between 20 and 40 years of age.

In "Rise of the Fourth Reich", investigators uncovered documentary evidence that the organization called ODESSA was known to authorities well before being "exposed" by Nazi hunter Simon Wiesenthal.

In "Jack the Ripper", forensic handwriting analysis expert Michelle Dresbold and psychological profiling expert Brent Turvey identified "quack" medicine purveyor Francis Tumblety as the most likely identity of the infamous serial killer.

Episodes

Broadcast airings
Repeats of the series have aired on the digital broadcast network Quest.

See also
MonsterQuest
In Search of...

References

External links

History (American TV channel) original programming
Paranormal television
2009 American television series debuts
2009 American television series endings